Below is a list of suburbs located within the Greater Newcastle region in New South Wales, Australia. This region (officially the Newcastle statistical subdivision) comprises the local government areas (LGAs) of City of Newcastle, City of Lake Macquarie, City of Cessnock, City of Maitland and Port Stephens Council. The 2021 Australian Census recorded the Newcastle Greater Metropolitan area as having a population of 682,465.

City of Newcastle suburbs

City of Lake Macquarie suburbs

City of Cessnock suburbs

City of Maitland suburbs

Port Stephens Council suburbs

Notes

References

External links 
 Geographical Names Board of NSW
 City of Newcastle
 City of Lake Macquarie
 Cessnock City Council
 Maitland City Council
 Port Stephens Council

Geography of New South Wales
Lists of suburbs in Australia
Suburbs
Suburbs
Suburbs
Suburbs